Colima is a state in West Mexico that is divided into ten municipalities. According to the 2020 Mexican Census, it has the smallest population of all Mexico's states with  inhabitants, and is the fifth smallest by land area spanning .

Municipalities in Colima are administratively autonomous of the state according to the 115th article of the 1917 Constitution of Mexico. The legal framework for Colima's municipalities is provided by Title VII of the state Constitution and the 2001 Law of Free Municipalities in the State of Colima. Every three years, citizens elect a municipal president (Spanish: presidente municipal) by a plurality voting system who heads a concurrently elected municipal council (ayuntamiento) responsible for providing all the public services for their constituents. The municipal council consists of a variable number of trustees and councillors (regidores y síndicos). Municipalities are responsible for public services (such as water and sewerage), street lighting, public safety, traffic, and the maintenance of public parks, gardens and cemeteries. They may also assist the state and federal governments in education, emergency fire and medical services, environmental protection and maintenance of monuments and historical landmarks. Since 1984, they have had the power to collect property taxes and user fees, although more funds are obtained from the state and federal governments than from their own income.

Article 88 of the state Constitution and Articles 11, 60 and 61 of the state's Law of Free Municipalities provide for the establishment of auxiliary authorities (autoridades auxiliares) to represent communities in the municipalities other than the municipal seat (cabecera). These are elected by residents of the communities every three years, and are unipersonal except in rural communities with a population over 2,000 inhabitants, which elect boards (juntas) comprising a president, secretary and treasurer. Auxiliary authorities serve as liaisons between local communities and the municipal government. They do not have executive powers and do not constitute an independent level of local government.

The largest municipality by population in Colima is Manzanillo, with 191,031 residents, and the smallest municipality  is Ixtlahuacán with 5,623 residents.

Municipalities

References

 
Colima